Norman S. Eddy (December 10, 1810 – January 28, 1872) was an American politician and military officer.

Early life
Norman S. Eddy was born on December 10, 1810, in Scipio, New York. He attended common schools. He graduated from Cazenovia Seminary. Eddy then sought admission into West Point, but was unsuccessful. He then studied law in the office of William H. Seward. graduated from the University of Pennsylvania School of Medicine, earning an M.D. in 1835.

Career
Eddy moved to Mishawaka, Indiana after graduation in 1835. There, he practiced medicine until 1847, when he changed his focus to law and moved to South Bend, Indiana. He was admitted to the bar on April 1, 1847. In South Bend, he had a medical practice with Louis Humphreys for a time. He formed a law partnership with Joseph Jernegan. He tried to organize a cavalry during the Mexican–American War, but the government did not accept it.

His efforts shifted again three years later, when he commenced a political career in the Democratic Party with a post in the Indiana State Senate in 1850. After holding that position and several other local offices, he was elected to the 33rd Congress, upon the retirement of Graham N. Fitch. Eddy served only one term in this office, as he was defeated by Schuyler Colfax when he attempted to run for re-election. Undaunted, Eddy continued his political career as Attorney General of the Territory of Minnesota, serving as an appointee of President Franklin Pierce in 1855. He was offered the role of Minister to the Hague and the Netherlands by President James Buchanan, but he declined. Eddy was appointed commissioner for the sale of the Delaware trust lands in 1857.

The outbreak of the American Civil War marked a new phase of Eddy's life, as he organized the 48th Indiana Infantry and received a commission as its colonel. Eddy served in this capacity for two years, but received disabling wounds in Mississippi at the Battle of Iuka and left the service in July 1863. He also fought in the Battle of Grand Gulf, Battle of Corinth and the Siege of Vicksburg. Despite the wounds, he was fortunate, as 119 of his 420 men were killed or wounded in the engagement after Eddy bivouacked his unit in directly front of an enemy artillery location.

After the close of his military career, Eddy resumed the practice of law. Eddy was Indiana's collector of internal revenue from 1865 to 1870, and then its Secretary of State of Indiana from 1870 to 1872.

Personal life
Around 1835, Eddy married Anna M. Melchior. They had six children. 

Eddy died from a heart condition on January 28, 1872, at his home in Indianapolis. An Episcopalian, Eddy was buried in South Bend City Cemetery in South Bend.

References

External links 
 
 Eddy's official Congressional biography.

United States Army officers
19th-century American Episcopalians
1810 births
1872 deaths
People of Indiana in the American Civil War
Secretaries of State of Indiana
Democratic Party members of the United States House of Representatives from Indiana
People from Scipio, New York
Perelman School of Medicine at the University of Pennsylvania alumni
People from Mishawaka, Indiana
Politicians from South Bend, Indiana
19th-century American politicians